SEAF may refer to:

Small Enterprise Assistance Funds
Seattle Erotic Art Festival